The 2019 Asian Shotgun Championships was the 9th Asian Shotgun Championships which took place from 20 to 30 September 2019, at Asanov Shooting Club, Almaty, Kazakhstan.

Medal summary

Men

Women

Mixed

Medal table

References

Results Book

External links
Asian Shooting Confederation

Shooting Championships
Asian
Asian Shooting Championships
Asian Shotgun Championships